Lippia alba is a species of flowering plant in the verbena family, Verbenaceae, that is native to southern Texas in the United States, Mexico, the Caribbean, Central America, and South America. 

In Ethiopia the plant is also known as Coseret and classified under herbal group. They use the plant leaf for preparing butter. 

The species is also present in Australia and India, where it is probably a human introduction. Common names include bushy matgrass, bushy lippia, hierba negra, juanilama, pamporegano, poleo and pitiona.

Uses
Bushy lippia is widely cultivated as an ornamental for its aromatic foliage and beautiful flowers. The essential oil composition is unique to each plant, but may include piperitone, geranial, neral, caryophyllene, camphor, eucalyptol, limonene, carvone, germacrene, α-guaiene, β-ocimene, linalool, or myrcene. The leaves are used for flavoring foods, such as mole sauces from Oaxaca, Mexico.  The plant is used medicinally for its somatic, sedative, antidepressant, and analgesic properties.

References

External links

alba
Garden plants of Central America
Plants described in 1925
Garden plants
Medicinal plants
Flora of the Caribbean
Flora of Central America
Flora of Mexico
Flora of South America
Flora of Texas
Flora without expected TNC conservation status
Taxa named by N. E. Brown
Taxa named by Philip Miller
Taxa named by Nathaniel Lord Britton
Taxa named by Percy Wilson